The 1989–90 season was Mansfield Town's 53rd season in the Football League and 19th in the Third Division they finished in 15th position with 55 points.

Final league table

Results

Football League Third Division

FA Cup

League Cup

League Trophy

Squad statistics
 Squad list sourced from

References
General
 Mansfield Town 1989–90 at soccerbase.com (use drop down list to select relevant season)

Specific

Mansfield Town F.C. seasons
Mansfield Town